Bahram Radan (born April 28, 1979) is an Iranian actor, producer and singer. He has received various accolades, including two Crystal Simorgh and a Hafez Award.

Career
While studying business management in college, Radan signed up for acting classes where he was discovered as an emerging talent. He got his first break when he was given an opportunity for his first role starring in the movie The Passion of Love. The movie achieved great success at the Iranian box office and was one of the top-grossing movies of 2000. Radan has since starred in many movies and has become a popular household name in the Middle East, often referred to as one of the top five superstars of Iranian cinema. His extreme popularity caused Iranian authorities to ban his images from billboards in 2008. In 2010, he was chosen by United Nations as the first Iranian UN ambassador against hunger.

While studying business management in college, Radan signed up for acting classes where he was discovered as an emerging talent. He got his first break when he was given an opportunity for his first role starring in the movie The Passion of Love. The movie achieved great success at the Iranian box office and was one of the top-grossing movies of 2000. Radan has since starred in many movies and has become a popular household name in the Middle East, often referred to as one of the top five superstars of Iranian cinema. His extreme popularity caused Iranian authorities to ban his images from billboards in 2008. In 2010, he was chosen by United Nations as the first Iranian UN ambassador against hunger.

He ventured into music and released his first album, The Other Side, in 2012. Music videos were created for three of the songs from the album: "Jeegh" (Scream), "To Rafti" (You Left) and "Zamouneh" (Era).

In June 2015, Radan tweeted support (in Persian) for the U.S. Supreme Court's decision legalizing gay marriage, and was compelled to delete the Tweet and forced to apologize after criticism from government-affiliated hardline media. Although The Guardian could not independently verify the claim, Iranian media reported that Radan had been summoned for questioning before the country's Ministry of Culture and Islamic Guidance, which vets films and cultural materials before their release.

In 2008, Radan acted in Tardid which is based on William Shakespeare's Hamlet. After that, he was "Zaal" in "Iran C project theatre“.

Filmography

Film

Web

Awards and nominations

Best Actor, Ladakh International Film Festival, India (LIFF) for "The Killer", 2012
"Young Artist of the Decade" Award, Best Artist of the Decade, 2007
Crystalline Roc Award (Best Actor in a Leading Role) for "Santoori (The Music Man)", 25th Fajr Film Festival (The only actor under 30 years of age having won 2 Crystalline Roc Awards), 2007
Paramount Male Youth of the Year, National Youth Magazine (40 Cheragh), 2006
Nominated in "Cinema Home" Yearly Awards (Best Actor in a Leading Role) for "Candle in the Wind", 2001
Crystalline Roc Award (Best Actor in a Leading Role) for "Candle in the Wind", 22nd Fajr Film Festival (The youngest actor receiving a Crystalline Roc Award), 2004
Hafiz Statuette Award (Best Actor) for "River's End", 7th Picture World Festival, 2004
Paramount Male Youth of the Year, National Youth Organization, 2004
First Iranian star attending Cannes Film Festival’s Red Carpet, 2004
Family Films Festival Award (Best Actor in a Leading Role) for "Swan's Cry", 2001
Nominated in "Cinema Home" Yearly Awards (Best Actor in a Leading Role) for "Swan's Cry", 2001
Nominated for Hafiz Statuette Award (Best Actor) for "Swan's Cry”

See also
 Iranian cinema
 List of Iranian actors

References

External links
Official Website

1979 births
Living people
Iranian male film actors
Iranian male models
People from Tehran
Iranian male singers
Islamic Azad University alumni
Crystal Simorgh for Best Actor winners